Warm Springs is a census-designated place in Riverside County, California. The 2010 United States census reported Warm Springs's population was 2,676.

Geography
According to the United States Census Bureau, the CDP covers an area of 2.0 square miles (5.2 km), all of it land.

Demographics
At the 2010 census Warm Springs had a population of 2,676. The racial makeup of Warm Springs was 1,673 (62.5%) White, 119 (4.4%) African American, 24 (0.9%) Native American, 102 (3.8%) Asian, 14 (0.5%) Pacific Islander, 606 (22.6%) from other races, and 138 (5.2%) from two or more races. Hispanic or Latino of any race were 1,232 persons (46.0%).

The whole population lived in households, no one lived in non-institutionalized group quarters and no one was institutionalized.

There were 902 households, 365 (40.5%) had children under the age of 18 living in them, 418 (46.3%) were opposite-sex married couples living together, 122 (13.5%) had a female householder with no husband present, 88 (9.8%) had a male householder with no wife present.  There were 105 (11.6%) unmarried opposite-sex partnerships, and 7 (0.8%) same-sex married couples or partnerships. 185 households (20.5%) were one person and 36 (4.0%) had someone living alone who was 65 or older. The average household size was 2.97.  There were 628 families (69.6% of households); the average family size was 3.44.

The age distribution was 698 people (26.1%) under the age of 18, 350 people (13.1%) aged 18 to 24, 763 people (28.5%) aged 25 to 44, 619 people (23.1%) aged 45 to 64, and 246 people (9.2%) who were 65 or older.  The median age was 31.1 years. For every 100 females, there were 103.7 males.  For every 100 females age 18 and over, there were 105.4 males.

There were 1,014 housing units at an average density of 500.4 per square mile, of the occupied units 414 (45.9%) were owner-occupied and 488 (54.1%) were rented. The homeowner vacancy rate was 1.9%; the rental vacancy rate was 11.1%.  1,386 people (51.8% of the population) lived in owner-occupied housing units and 1,290 people (48.2%) lived in rental housing units.

References

Census-designated places in Riverside County, California
Census-designated places in California